L. poeppigii may refer to:

 Lacistema poeppigii, a flowering plant
 Lagothrix poeppigii, a woolly monkey
 Lankesterella poeppigii, a parasite that infects amphibians
 Lasiurus poeppigii, a hairy-tailed bat
 Leptopus poeppigii, a flowering plant